A. Manju is an Indian Politician from the state of Karnataka. He was a three-term member of the Karnataka Legislative Assembly representing the Arkalgud constituency.

Political party
He was elected as MLA from Arkalgud as BJP's candidate in 1999. Later he joined Congress Party and won Arkalgud Vidhan Sabha seats in 2008 and 2013. After the 2013 elections, he was a minister under Chief Minister Siddaramaiah. 

He contested the 2014 Lok Sabha elections as a Congress candidate from Hassan constituency but lost to Deve Gowda. Later he re-joined Bhartiya Janata Party, and was its losing candidate in the Hassan Lok Sabha constituency in 2019, this time losing to Deve Gowda's grandson Prajwal Revanna.

Ministry
He was the Minister for Animal Husbandry, Fisheries Department in the K. Siddaramaiah led Karnataka Government.

Gallery

References 

Bharatiya Janata Party politicians from Karnataka
Karnataka MLAs 2018–2023
Karnataka MLAs 2008–2013
Karnataka MLAs 2013–2018
Indian National Congress politicians from Karnataka
Place of birth missing (living people)
Living people
1957 births